Moses Anim is a Ghanaian politician and member of the Seventh Parliament of the Fourth Republic of Ghana representing the Trobu Constituency in the Greater Accra Region on the ticket of the New Patriotic Party.

Early life and education 
Anim was born on 25 April 1965. He hails from Adukrom in the Eastern Region of Ghana. He studied at the University of Ghana where he obtained his Bachelor of Science degree Biochemistry and his Master of Business Administration degree in Project Management in 1991 and 2005 respectively.

Career 
Prior to entering politics, Anim was the Project Manager of Wilhelm Construction Company Limited in Accra.

Politics 
Anim entered parliament on 7 January 2013 on the ticket of the New Patriotic Party representing the Trobu Constituency. Out of the 76,782 valid votes cast, he polled 46,446 votes (58.96%) to win the seat. He was re-elected in 2016 to remain in parliament for another four (4)-year term.

Personal life 
He identifies as a Christian and a member of the Church of Pentecost.

References 

Ghanaian MPs 2017–2021
1965 births
Living people
New Patriotic Party politicians